Dictyna turbida is a species of spiders of the genus Dictyna. It is native to India and Sri Lanka.

See also
 List of Dictynidae species

References

Spiders described in 1905
Dictynidae
Spiders of Asia